The UPRM College of Engineering is one of four colleges of the University of Puerto Rico at Mayaguez. This school is also the largest of its kind in Puerto Rico, with an enrollment of about 5,000 undergraduate students and about 400 graduates. It is the main producer of Hispanic engineers in the United States of America, according to the American Society of Engineering Education (ASEE).

History

Academics

Departments
The School of Engineering currently consists of seven departments:

Electrical and Computer Engineering Department
Computer Science and Engineering Department 
Civil Engineering and Surveying Department
 Engineering Science and Materials Department
Industrial Engineering Department
Mechanical Engineering Department
Chemical Engineering Department

References

External links
 College of Engineering Official Site
 Official Site of the Computer Science and Engineering Department
 Official Site of the Electrical and Computer Engineering Department
 Official Site of the Engineering Science and Materials Department
 Official Site of the Civil Engineering and Surveying Department
 Official Site of the Mechanical Engineering Department
 Official Site of the Industrial Engineering Department
 Official Site of the Chemical Engineering Department

University of Puerto Rico at Mayagüez
Education in Mayagüez, Puerto Rico